The Royal Academy of Engineering is the UK national academy in the field of engineering. Its purpose is to bring together the most successful and talented engineers to advance and promote excellence in engineering.

Each year about 50 new fellows are admitted to the academy, after evaluation by the membership committee and election by existing fellows. Engineers who have achieved international distinction in their field, and who are not British citizens or residents, are elected and named as International Fellow and are entitled to use FREng after their names.

International fellows 
Recently elected international fellows are shown below.

References

Royal Academy of Engineering
Royal Academy of Engineering
.